The College of Westchester (CW) is a private for-profit college in White Plains, New York. It offers Bachelor's degrees and Associate degrees along with certificate options during the day, evening, Saturday, and online with programs in business, accounting, allied health, digital media and technology.

Accreditation
The College of Westchester is accredited by The Middle States Commission on Higher Education, an institutional accrediting agency recognized by the U.S. Secretary of Education and the Council for Higher Education Accreditation. All programs offered are registered by the New York State Education Department.

Notable people
Alumni

Benicio del Toro

References

External links
 Official website

Education in White Plains, New York
Educational institutions established in 1915
Universities and colleges in Westchester County, New York
1915 establishments in New York (state)
For-profit universities and colleges in the United States